Gandhari may refer to:

 Gandhari (Mahabharata), a character in the Indian epic Mahabharata
 Gandhari khilla, a hill fort near Bokkalagutta, Telangana, India
 Gandhari language, north-western prakrit spoken in Gāndhāra
Kharosthi, or Gandhari script
 Gandhari people, a tribe attested from the Rigveda and later texts
 Gāndhārī temple, in Hebbya village, Mysore, India 
 Ghandari people, who lived in Gandhara
 Gandhari (film), a 1993 Malayalam-language film

See also
 
 

 Kandahari (disambiguation)
 Gandahar (disambiguation)
 Gandhar (disambiguation)

Language and nationality disambiguation pages